In Enemy Hands is a 2004 American submarine film directed by Tony Giglio and starring William H. Macy, Til Schweiger, Thomas Kretschmann, Scott Caan and Lauren Holly. The film follows an American submarine crew getting captured by a German submarine crew and taken prisoner aboard their U-boat.

Plot

The movie begins with old film footage of World War II with a narrator explaining that Germany produced hundreds of U-boats to control the Atlantic. In 1942, groups of U-boats known as wolfpacks sank over a thousand Allied ships. The Germans began winning the war and if they continued to succeed in destroying the Allies, the Germans will conquer all of Europe. In 1943, Roosevelt and Churchill declared that stopping the U-boats was their main priority. With new technology and the United States committed to the war, the Allies begin destroying the U-boats and bringing an end to the wolfpacks.

In June 1943, Lt. Cmdr. Randall Sullivan (Caan) talks about his upcoming mission with Admiral Kentz (Berkeley). Kentz asks about Sullivan's COB Nathan Travers (Macy) and says he's a good man and Sullivan could learn something from him and bids Sullivan farewell. Elsewhere, as Travers prepares to depart home for the Swordfish, wife Rachel (Holly) makes him promise to come home safe. Two months later, Travers is on board the fictional USS Swordfish (based on the real submarine  in World War II), captained by Sullivan, who has the crew constantly perform general quarters drills.

Meanwhile, the fictional U-429 (based on the real U-429 submarine), captained by Jonas Herdt (Schweiger)survives a depth charge attack by an American destroyer, after which U-429 sinks the ship. After playing chess with his First Watch Officer Ludwig Cremer (Kretschmann), Jonas receives a message from home. The message informs Jonas the German city of Hamburg got bombed. The bombing destroyed his daughter's school and there were no survivors, implying that Jonas' daughter was killed.

On the Swordfish, XO Teddy Goodman (Gregg) becomes increasingly sick with a rash on his stomach, which the doctor believes is meningitis, an extremely contagious disease that can sometimes be fatal. Unknown to the crew, CO Sullivan too has a rash on his arm, indicating he has contracted meningitis.

Meanwhile, German U-boat U-821 sinks the British merchant vessel Achilles. Since there hasn't been any U-boat activity in the area for a while, the closest Allied vessel, the Swordfish, goes to investigate.

Radio operator Virgil Wright (Huntington) hears music played by Glenn Miller coming from the U-821, and Sullivan prepares the crew to attack. U-821 detects the two torpedoes fired from the Swordfish and it dodges them, getting into attack position in the process. XO Goodman dies from his sickness. COB Travers takes his place, allowing the Swordfish to fire a third torpedo and destroy the U-821, but the delay caused by Goodman's death allows the U-boat to locate the Swordfish and fire a torpedo before being destroyed.

U-821's torpedo explodes near the Swordfish. The explosive wave fatally damages the boat, killing most of the crew and forcing the American sub to surface. CO Sullivan, COB Travers, and six other crew (Wright, engineers Abers (Sisto), and Ox (Gallagher), and torpedomen Miller (Somerholder), Cooper (Giovinazzo), and Romano (Morgan) abandon ship and are taken prisoner by U-429.

The Germans split their prisoners into two groups: Travers, Ox, Cooper, and Miller in the bow and Sullivan, Wright, Abers, and Romano in the stern. Wright nurses Sullivan and discovers his rash, where Abers recognizes it as meningitis and the group realizes that if the Germans don't kill them, the disease will.

Days later, U-428 prepares to attack an American destroyer, the fictional USS Logan (based on the real . Travers and his group break free of their bonds. They are able to fire one of the German sub's torpedoes off course, away from the Logan. When the torpedo detonates the Logan is alerted to the U-boat's presence. The Logan then attacks U-429 with depth charges. The explosions allows CO Sullivan's group to break free as well. Sullivan protects his crew by fighting off a German guard, but he succumbs to his illness in the process.

Meanwhile, the meningitis spreads and kills two thirds of the German crew, including Romano of the American crew. Later on, Travers has a hallucination of Rachel, who reminds him of his promise to come home.

With no other choice, U-429's CO Jonas decides to have Travers' men work with his remaining crew in order to save them all. They plan to sail to the US coast and be taken into custody. As both crews reluctantly work together, Jonas explains to Travers that he saved Travers' men in defiance of the standing protocol of capturing only the captain and COB of an enemy ship. He says he personally saved all of them because he's grown tired of the war and he felt strong for himself by saving lives instead of taking them.

Jonas says if they come across either enemy, they must guarantee that their men will go home. During their travel to the US coast, Klause (Heger), the U-429's quartermaster, becomes disillusioned with Jonas working with the Americans and orchestrates a mutiny, along with two other crew members, Lieutenant Bauer and the U-429'''s radio operator Christophe. Abers and Wright subdue Christophe, who makes a distress call to other U-boats, and engineer Hans (Thorsen) knocks out Bauer to save Ox. Klause unsuccessfully attempts to use the last bow torpedo to blow up the boat and with his knife fatally stabs Jonas in the back. Travers reacts by using a hoist chain to break Klause's neck, killing him quickly. With his dying breath, Jonas gives command of the boat to Cremer.

The U-429 crew again encounters the Logan and tries to make contact with the destroyer, but they're attacked by U-1221, another U-boat that responded to the distress call. U-1221 fires several torpedoes in an attempt to sink the U-429, while the Logan is once again put on the alert. Enduring heavy damage as they evade every torpedo attack, two German crew members try to convince Cremer to fight back, but he refuses to fire on his own countrymen.

Abers and Travers convince Cremer to fight, only for him to reveal that they only have one torpedo left in the stern. After passing on top of the enemy submarine to align the stern tubes with it, the crew uses the last torpedo to destroy the U-1221, but it doesn't detonate. U-1221 fires another torpedo U-429 but it doesn't cause any serious damage. Before the torpedo explodes, the Logan locates the U-1221 with its sonar and fires its guns into the water, destroying the U-boat.

When Travers makes contact with the Logan, Captain Samuel Littleton (Ellis) orders Travers to take the Enigma. Travers falsifies that they're sinking and disconnects with the Logan, keeping his promise to Cremer to never let the U-429 be captured. The crew floods the boat and are rescued by the Logan.

Returning home, Travers argues with Kentz about the Germans saving their lives. Kentz says the Germans are still the enemy, but he'll do his best to have them taken care of. Travers and Rachel are reunited and they go visit Cremer in a POW compound, where Rachel thanks Cremer for saving her husband's life. Travers gives him cigarettes and tells Cremer that it's good to see him as Travers leaves and Cremer watches on.

 Cast 
 William H. Macy as COB Nathan Travers
 Til Schweiger as Captain Jonas Herdt
 Scott Caan as Lieutenant-Commander Randall Sullivan
 Thomas Kretschmann as 1st Watch Officer Ludwig Cremer
 Lauren Holly as Rachel Travers
 Connor Donne as Lieutenant Bauer
 Clark Gregg as Lieutenant Teddy Goodman
 Carmine Giovinazzo as Cooper
 Sam Huntington as Virgil Wright
 Jeremy Sisto as Abers
 Ian Somerholder as Miller
 Branden Morgan as Romano
 Patrick Gallagher as Ox
 Chris Ellis as Captain Samuel Littleton
Rene Heger as Klause
 Sven-Ole Thorsen as Hans

Alternate titles
When the film was shown on Albanian television, it was given a title that translates as Underwater Prison in English, and had similar titles in some other countries' TV schedules U-429: Underwater Prison in Armenia.

Continuity Errors
The actual USS Swordfish'' was a Sargo-class submarine, while in the film, the boat was described as a Balao-class submarine, which was a much later model.

References

External links

2004 films
Films about anti-fascism
Films about the United States Navy in World War II
U-boat fiction
World War II submarine films
Films directed by Tony Giglio
Films scored by Steven Bramson
2000s political films
American World War II films
American political films
American thriller drama films
2000s American films